Native pomegranate may refer to:

 Balaustion, a plant genus from Western Australia
 Capparis arborea, a plant species from eastern Australia
 Capparis canescens, a plant species from eastern Australia
 Capparis mitchellii, a plant species found all over Australia (aka native orange)

See also
Pomegranate